Korea Science Academy of KAIST (한국과학기술원 부설 한국과학영재학교) is a science magnet school, located in Busan, South Korea. It was founded in 1991 as Busan (Pusan) Science High School (BSA). In 2001, BSA was designated as a school for science gifted students in 2001 by the Ministry of Science and Technology. The name was changed to the Korea Science Academy (KSA) in 2005. In 2009 the school announced formal ties with KAIST.

History 

 December 18, 1989 Ministry of Education approved to establish Busan Science Academy.
 March 1, 1991 Chang-sik Shin appointed to first principal.
 March 1, 1991 Ministry of Education appointed BSA as researching school (until February 28, 1993.) (Research Topic : Development of advanced science learning program for gifted students.)
 March 4, 1991 Opened school and took first entrance ceremony. (2classes, 60 students.)
 February 11, 1993 First completion ceremony (41 students passed in the entrance examination of KAIST)
 February 15, 1994 First graduation ceremony and second completion ceremony (Graduated: 16 students, No. of students who completed courses of BSA: 51)
 March 1, 1994 Chan-ung Park appointed to second principal.
 March 1, 1997 Ministry of Education appointed BSA as a model school (until February 28, 1998.) (Topic : Developing and operating "High school information management system")
 February 18, 1998 School building newly constructed in new place and moved. (Yeonsan 9(gu)-dong, Yeonje-gu, Busan, Korea. → Danggam 3(sam)-dong, Busanjin-gu, Busan, Korea.)
 November 1, 2001 Ministry of science and technology appointed BSA as "Science Academy for gifted students.".
 November 14, 2001 Ministry of science and technology and Busan metropolitan district office of education concluded the agreement about "Science Academy for gifted students." .
 April 12, 2002 Busan metropolitan district office of education and KAIST concluded the agreement about managing "Science Academy for gifted students.".
 March 5, 2003 Took entrance ceremony of 144 Science Academy students
 July 12, 2005 Changed the name of school to "Korea Science Academy"
 August 29, 2005 The 1st graduation ceremony of KSA (14 students)
 August 21~26, 2006 International Students Science Fair 2006 at KSA (21 countries, 67 schools).
 March 1, 2008 Professor of KAIST, Ph.D Jang-hyeok Kwon appointed to the principal.** First University professor principal in high school
 May 22, 2008 KSA and KAIST concluded MOU to unification. (To speaking strictly, KSA will be an attached high school of KAIST.)
 March 1, 2009 Inauguration of Jang-hyuk Kwon as the 7th principal
 March 4, 2009 Entrance Ceremony of KSA of KAIST (141 students)
 February 3, 2010 Entrance Ceremony of KSA of KAIST (160 students / 143 Korean Students, 17 international students)
 February 9, 2011 Entrance Ceremony of KSA of KAIST (154 students / 146 Korean Students, 8 international students)
 February 22, 2012 Entrance Ceremony of KSA of KAIST (157 students / 149 Korean Students, 8 international students)
 February 20, 2013 Entrance Ceremony of KSA of KAIST (149 students)
 March 1, 2013 Inauguration of CHUNG Yoon as the 8th principal

Curriculum 
The curriculum is composed of academic courses (135 credits), Creative Research Activities (30 credits), Leadership Activities courses (8AU)

International Academic Exchange Programs 
Academic exchanges with overseas prestigious universities, research centers and other related institutions for the gifted.

Partnership Schools (22 organizations in 12 countries)

Admission Policy 
Highly gifted students with potential and creativity are selected through 2 or 3 phases process. 144 students nationwide are admitted every year.

Qualification 
With outstanding abilities in mathematics and science, middle school students, graduated from middle school and students with equivalent qualifications can apply for KSA of KAIST. In addition, students recommended by gifted student education centers, principals, teachers and the superintendents of their local Office of Education can apply for the school.
Students who have passed an official qualification test are eligible to be recommended by local superintendents

Facilities 

1. Hi-Tech Science Building (Changjo-gwan)
 The science building (building size : 61,200 square feet) houses labs
 9-story building, 1,150 square meters
 Designed for lab work in information and applied sciences
 A center for research the engages students and professors

2. Art&Physical Education Building (Seol Dong-geun-gwan (previous Yeji-gwan))
 Character development through the students' activities such as sports and a number of club activities
 Building size : 6-story building including the basement
 facilities : 36 rooms – recreation music room, gymnasium, orchestra room, music room, art room, pottery room, and club rooms including photo room, press center  etc.

3. Dormitories
 177 rooms in the male student residence (Gyoenu-gwan), 79 rooms in the female student residence (Jignyeo-gwan)
 On weekends, a wide variety of volunteer works and general interest programs are available.

4. ECC (English Communication Center)
 Three exclusive foreign language classrooms
 English Therapy Programs with native speakers of English
 Issue KSA Newspaper

6. Guest House (Baekyang-gwan)
 17 rooms for visiting faculty and parents
 facilities : 2 conference rooms, 1 laundry

See also 
 Gyeonggi Science High School
 Seoul Science High School
 Daegu Science High School

References 

Science high schools in South Korea
Schools in Busan
Educational institutions established in 1991
1991 establishments in South Korea